Brevipecten is a genus of moths of the family Noctuidae.

Description
Palpi slight and reaching vertex of head. Antennae of male bipectinated to three-fourths length with long branches. Thorax and abdomen smoothly scaled. Tibia with slight tufts of hair on outer side. Forewings with rectangular apex. Inner margin nearly straight after the basal lobe. Veins 8 and 9 anastomosing to form areole. Hindwings with vein 5 from above angle of cell.

Species
 Brevipecten captata (Butler, 1889)
 Brevipecten clearchus Fawcett, 1916
 Brevipecten consanguis Leech, 1900
 Brevipecten cornuta Hampson, 1902
 Brevipecten costiplaga Draudt, 1950
 Brevipecten dufayi Viette, 1976
 Brevipecten malagasy Viette, 1965
 Brevipecten niloticus Wiltshire, 1977
 Brevipecten purpureotincta Hampson, 1895

References

 

Calpinae
Moth genera